Society of Independent Artists was an association of American artists founded in 1916 and based in New York.

Background

Based on the French Société des Artistes Indépendants, the goal of the society was to hold annual exhibitions by avant-garde artists. Exhibitions were to be open to anyone who wanted to display their work, and shows were without juries or prizes. In order to enter, one had to pay a six-dollar membership and entry fee. Founders of the Society were Walter Arensberg, John Covert, Marcel Duchamp, Katherine Sophie Dreier, William J. Glackens, Albert Gleizes, John Marin, Walter Pach, Man Ray, Mary Rogers (artist), John Sloan and Joseph Stella.

The "First Annual Exhibition" of the society at the Grand Central Palace, New York, April 10-May 6, 1917, included more than 2,000 art works, which the catalog indicates were hung in alphabetical order by the artist's last name. Although there were entries from all over the world, they were predominantly by artists of New York and other East Coast cities.

Marcel Duchamp resigned as a director after the Society refused to include in the exhibition the Fountain — a readymade in the form of a urinal and signed with the pseudonym "R. Mutt." The incident pointed out that the exhibition was not truly open.

Following the first president, William Glackens, John Sloan was president from 1918 until his death in 1951. From 1918 to 1934 A.S. Baylinson served as secretary.

See also
 Tulip Hysteria Co-ordinating

References
 
  Essay by William Clark

Notes

Further reading
  "Gives the history of the Society, decade by decade, many appendices (officers, exhibitors, purchasers, by-laws, members, etc.), catalogs of exhibitions, and index of text. Almost 500 pages consist of the alphabetical listing of artists and their entries."

External links
 Documenting the Gilded Age: New York City Exhibitions at the Turn of the 20th Century A New York Art Resources Consortium project. Exhibition catalogs of the Society of Independent Artists.

 
American artist groups and collectives
Modern art
Arts organizations based in New York (state)
Arts organizations established in 1916
1916 establishments in the United States